The Pitch is a UK light entertainment talent contest television programme, which airs on a Friday night,. The show was launched on 30 November 2012.
The basis of the show is for contestants to perform their music/singing/comedy acts in front of a panel of media experts with the potential prize of winning their own television show,. The panel consists of Loaded TV owner Paul Baxendale-Walker, 'Jonglers' comedy clubs proprietor Maria Kempinska, broadcaster and sports agent Eric Hall, magazine editor Ian Edmondson, and actress and Creative Director of Brighton Film School Carol Harrison.

References 

2010s British television series
British variety television shows